The 2009–10 Eredivisie was the 54th season of Eredivisie since its establishment in 1955. AZ were the reigning champions. A total of 18 teams is taking part in the league, consisting of 16 who competed in the previous season and two promoted from the Eerste Divisie. The teams promoted from the Eerste Divisie at the end of the previous season were champions VVV-Venlo and promotion/relegation play-off winners RKC Waalwijk.

The season started on 31 July 2009 and ended on 2 May 2010. FC Twente won their first ever Eredivisie title.

Overview

Teams and stadia

Personnel and sponsoring

Managerial changes

League table

Results

Goalscorers
Including games played on 2 May 2010; Source: Yahoo Sport, ESPN Soccernet, Soccerway, Eredivisie (official site)

Top scorers

Other scorers
12 goals

  Jeremain Lens (AZ)
  Blaise Nkufo (Twente)

11 goals

  Jon Dahl Tomasson (Feyenoord)
  Gerald Sibon (Heerenveen)
  Otman Bakkal (PSV)
  Danny Koevermans (PSV)

10 goals

  Siem de Jong (Ajax)
  Erik Falkenburg (Sparta)
  Rydell Poepon (Sparta)
  Miroslav Stoch (Twente)

9 goals

  Matthew Amoah (NAC)
  Sandro Calabro (VVV)

8 goals

  Willie Overtoom (Heracles)
  Bjorn Vleminckx (NEC)
  Willem Janssen (Roda JC)
  Jacob Mulenga (Utrecht)

7 goals

  Wesley Verhoek (ADO)
  Demy de Zeeuw (Ajax)
  Roy Makaay (Feyenoord)
  Michal Papadopulos (Heerenveen)
  Anthony Lurling (NAC)
  Derk Boerrigter (RKC)
  Ricky van Wolfswinkel (Utrecht)
  Santi Kolk (Vitesse Arnhem)
  Lasse Nilsson (Vitesse Arnhem)
  Frank Demouge (Willem II)

6 goals

  Dennis Rommedahl (Ajax)
  Gregory van der Wiel (Ajax)
  Thomas Enevoldsen (Groningen)
  Andreas Granqvist (Groningen)
  Edwin de Graaf (NAC)
  Kees Kwakman (NAC)
  Charlison Benschop (RKC)
  Dries Mertens (Utrecht)
  Keisuke Honda (VVV)
  Saïd Boutahar (Willem II)

5 goals

  Urby Emanuelson (Ajax)
  Brett Holman (AZ)
  Maarten Martens (AZ)
  Sekou Cissé (Feyenoord)
  Koen van de Laak (Groningen)
  Nicklas Pedersen (Groningen)
  Viktor Elm (Heerenveen)
  Darl Douglas (Heracles)
  Saidi Ntibazonkiza (NEC)
  Danko Lazović (PSV)
  Boldizsár Bodor (Roda JC)
  Kenneth Perez (Twente)
  Héctor Moreno (AZ)
  Christophe Grégoire (Willem II)

4 goals

  Danny Buijs (ADO)
  Bogdan Milić (ADO)
  Karim Soltani (ADO)
  Darío Cvitanich (Ajax)
  Mousa Dembélé (AZ)
  Andwélé Slory (Feyenoord)
  Ron Vlaar (Feyenoord)
  Georginio Wijnaldum (Feyenoord)
  Roy Beerens (Heerenveen)
  Hernán Losada (Heerenveen)
  Leonardo Santiago (NAC)
  Ramon Zomer (NEC)
  Ibrahim Afellay (PSV)
  Fred Benson (RKC)
  Benjamin De Ceulaer (RKC)
  Morten Skoubo (Roda JC)
  Jacob Lensky (Utrecht)
  Claudemir (Vitesse Arnhem)
  Onur Kaya (Vitesse Arnhem)
  Adil Auassar (VVV)
  Ruud Boymans (VVV)
  Stefan Nijland (Willem II)
  Sergio Zijler (Willem II)

3 goals

  Ricky van den Bergh (ADO)
  Ismaïl Aissati (Ajax)
  Jan Vertonghen (Ajax)
  Rasmus Elm (AZ)
  André Bahia (Feyenoord)
  Jonathan de Guzmán (Feyenoord)
  Oluwafemi Ajilore (Groningen)
  Michel Breuer (Heerenveen)
  Paulo Henrique (Heerenveen)
  Samuel Armenteros (Heracles)
  Marko Vejinović (Heracles)
  Erton Fejzullahu (NEC)
  John Goossens (NEC)
  Nordin Amrabat (PSV)
  Jonathan Reis (PSV)
  Fouad Idabdelhay (RKC)
  Anouar Hadouir (Roda JC)
  Jeanvion Yulu-Matondo (Roda JC)
  Dalibor Stevanovič (Vitesse Arnhem)
  Ahmed Ahahaoui (VVV)
  Gonzalo García (VVV)
  Ruben Schaken (VVV)

2 goals

  Timothy Derijck (ADO)
  Csaba Horváth (ADO)
  Kees Luijckx (ADO)
  Toby Alderweireld (Ajax)
  Kennedy Bakircioglu (Ajax)
  Mitchell Donald (Ajax – 1/Willem II – 1)
  Miralem Sulejmani (Ajax)
  Graziano Pellè (AZ)
  Luigi Bruins (Feyenoord)
  Leroy Fer (Feyenoord)
  Denny Landzaat (Feyenoord)
  Leandro Bacuna (Groningen)
  Danny Holla (Groningen)
  Goran Lovre (Groningen)
  Morten Nordstrand (Groningen)
  Fredrik Stenman (Groningen)
  Birger Maertens (Heracles)
  Sebastiaan Steur (Heracles)
  Donny Gorter (NAC)
  Patrick Zwaanswijk (NAC)
  Youssef El Akchaoui (NEC)
  Bram Nuytinck (NEC)
  Patrick Pothuizen (NEC)
  Arkadiusz Radomski (NEC)
  Orlando Engelaar (PSV)
  Zakaria Labyad (PSV)
  Stanislav Manolev (PSV)
  Davy De Fauw (Roda JC)
  Marcel de Jong (Roda JC)
  Pa Modou Kah (Roda JC)
  Jan-Paul Saeijs (Roda JC)
  Edouard Duplan (Sparta)
  Joshua John (Sparta)
  Kevin Strootman (Sparta)
  Douglas (Twente)
  Luuk de Jong (Twente)
  Nicky Kuiper (Twente)
  Sander Keller (Utrecht)
  Michael Silberbauer (Utrecht)
  Jan Wuytens (Utrecht)
  Alexander Büttner (Vitesse Arnhem)
  Serginho Greene (Vitesse Arnhem)
  Sinan Kaloğlu (Vitesse Arnhem)
  Wiljan Pluim (Vitesse Arnhem)
  Paul Verhaegh (Vitesse Arnhem)
  Ken Leemans (VVV)
  Ferry de Regt (VVV)
  Bart Biemans (Willem II)
  Gerson Sheotahul (Willem II)
  Arjan Swinkels (Willem II)

1 goal

  Santy Hulst (ADO)
  Lex Immers (ADO)
  Christian Kum (ADO)
  Andres Oper (ADO)
  Charlton Vicento (ADO)
  Eyong Enoh (Ajax)
  Rasmus Lindgren (Ajax)
  Jonathas (AZ)
  Niklas Moisander (AZ)
  Sébastien Pocognoli (AZ)
  Simon Poulsen (AZ)
  David Mendes da Silva (AZ)
  Pontus Wernbloom (AZ)
  Stefan Babović (Feyenoord)
  Diego Biseswar (Feyenoord)
  Kevin Hofland (Feyenoord)
  Stefan de Vrij (Feyenoord)
  Oussama Assaidi (Heerenveen)
  Filip Đuričić (Heerenveen)
  Samir Fazli (Heerenveen)
  Christian Grindheim (Heerenveen)
  Goran Popov (Heerenveen)
  Mika Väyrynen (Heerenveen)
  Paweł Wojciechowski (Heerenveen)
  Mark-Jan Fledderus (Heracles)
  Antoine van der Linden (Heracles)
  Mark Looms (Heracles)
  Ellery Cairo (NAC)
  Kurt Elshot (NAC)
  Csaba Feher (NAC)
  Robbert Schilder (NAC)
  Ferne Snoyl (NAC)
  Lorenzo Davids (NEC)
  Bas Sibum (NEC)
  Rick ten Voorde (NEC)
  Francisco Rodríguez (PSV)
  Jagoš Vuković (PSV)
  Kemy Agustien (RKC)
  Ruud Berger (RKC)
  Dustley Mulder (RKC)
  Hans Mulder (RKC)
  Arnaud Sutchuin (Roda JC)
  Ruud Vormer (Roda JC)
  Ayodele Adeleye (Sparta)
  Darko Bodul (Sparta)
  Sander van Gessel (Sparta)
  Milano Koenders (Sparta)
  Wout Brama (Twente)
  Theo Janssen (Twente)
  Ronnie Stam (Twente)
  Dwight Tiendalli (Twente)
  Cheick Tioté (Twente)
  Peter Wisgerhof (Twente)
  Nana Asare (Utrecht)
  Tim Cornelisse (Utrecht)
  Erixon Danso (Utrecht)
  Francis Dickoh (Utrecht)
  Gregoor van Dijk (Utrecht)
  Gianluca Nijholt (Utrecht)
  Alje Schut (Utrecht)
  Kevin Vandenbergh (Utrecht)
  Nicky Hofs (Vitesse Arnhem)
  Civard Sprockel (Vitesse Arnhem)
  Kevin Van Dessel (VVV)
  Frank van Kouwen (VVV)
  Patrick Paauwe (VVV)
  Michael Timisela (VVV)
  Michael Uchebo (VVV)
  Alex Nkume (VVV)
  Jan-Arie van der Heijden (Willem II)
  Marlon Pereira (Willem II)	

Own goals
 Scored for ADO (5):  Giovanni van Bronckhorst (Feyenoord);  Gibril Sankoh (Groningen);  Antoine van der Linden (Heracles);  Mark Looms (Heracles);  Bram Nuytinck (NEC)
 Scored for Ajax (2):  Hans Mulder (RKC);  Paul Verhaegh (Vitesse Arnhem)
 Scored for AZ (4):  Martin Lejsal (Heerenveen);  Pa Modou Kah (Roda JC);  Peter Wisgerhof (Twente – 2 goals)
 Scored for Feyenoord (3):  Pontus Wernbloom (AZ);  Toni Varela (RKC);  Patrick Paauwe (VVV)
 Scored for NAC (1):  Niels Wellenberg (NEC)
 Scored for NEC (1):  Christiaan Kum (ADO)
 Scored for RKC (2):  Marko Pantelić (Ajax);  Calvin Jong-a-Pin (Vitesse Arnhem)
 Scored for Roda JC (2):  Jurgen Colin (RKC);  Frank van der Struijk (Vitesse Arnhem)
 Scored for Vitesse Arnhem (1):  Dustley Mulder (RKC)
 Scored for VVV (1):  Civard Sprockel (Vitesse Arnhem)
 Scored for Willem II (1):  Ayodele Adeleye (Sparta)

Play-offs

European competition
The teams placed 6th through 9th compete in a play-off tournament for one spot in the second qualifying round of the UEFA Europa League 2010–11.

Semi-finals

Final

Relegation
The 16th and 17th placed teams, along with the teams from Eerste Divisie, participate in a play-off for two spots in 2010–11 Eredivisie.

Round 1

Round 2

Round 3

Willem II and Excelsior will play in 2010–11 Eredivisie.

References

Eredivisie seasons
Netherlands
1